Reanimedia is an anime distributor in Russia, Belarus, Kazakhstan and the Baltic States, working in cooperation with Reanimedia Japan. The company was founded in 2007.

The main declared objective of the company is to distribute Russian editions of notable anime titles that approach Japanese standards of image quality, packaging and additional materials. The company also works as a publisher and supports local anime festivals, clubs of interest and other anime-related events.

History
Reanimedia was founded in mid-2007 as a successor of XL Media

On October 22, 2007, Reanimedia announced that it was planning to acquire XL Media. Consolidation between the two companies was expected to finish by February 2008. However, on May 6, 2008, Reanimedia announced that the agreement had been cancelled due to "irreconcilable differences" between the firms. XL Media employees who had previously joined Reanimedia continued working for their new employer. XL Media was acquired by a third party and continued working with new employees.

The dubbing studio, which was originally created in October 2005 to perform dubbing of OVA Tristia and later performed a number of dubbing works for XL Media (see List of works for XL Media, below), became a part of Reanimedia in 2007.

At the beginning of 2008, Reanimedia released its first products: Pet Shop of Horrors and Five centimeters per second.

On June 1, 2009, Reanimedia opened its own online store.

Employees
Staff
 Artem Tolstobrov — CEO
 Stepan Shashkin — general producer
 Oleg Shevchenko — CFO
 Andrey Petrov — director of development
 Aleksandr Filchenko — dubbing director
 Valery Korneev — art director
 Lidiya Kulikova — editor in chief

Dubbing actors

Information about the dubbing actors can be found at Reanimedia's site.

Translators

List of works

List of anime licenses

List of book licenses

List of works for XL Media
The dubbing studio, which has been a part of Reanimedia since 2007, was originally created in October 2005 to perform dubbing of OVA Tristia for XL Media. In 2005–2007, the studio was working for XL Media and performed dubbing of the following titles:

List of works in cooperation

Cinema Prestige
Reanimedia performed dubbing of the following titles:
{| class="wikitable"
|-
| 2009 || Taro, the son of the dragon (Tatsu no Ko Tarou)
|-
| 2009 || Treasure Island (Dobutsu Takarajima)
|-
| 2009 || Ali Baba and the Forty Thieves (Alibaba to Yonjubiki no Tozuku)
|-
| 2009 || Flying Phantom Ship (Sora Tobu Yureisen)
|-
| 2009 || The Return of Puss in Boots (Nagagutsu Sanjuushi)
|-
| 2010 || The Adventures of Gulliver (Gulliver no Uchuu Ryokou)
|-
|}

Istari comics

The following manga was produced in cooperation with Reanimedia:
{| class="wikitable"
|-
| 2009 || Spice and Wolf (Ookami to Koushinryou)
|-
|}

Mega-Anime
Reanimedia undertakes preparation for publication (including dubbing and mastering) of several works licensed by Mega-Anime:
{| class="wikitable"
|-
| 2010 || Evangelion: 1.11 You are (not) alone
|-
| 2011 || Paradise Kiss (Paradaisu Kisu)
|-
|}

Russian Cinema Council (RUSCICO)
Reanimedia performs dubbing of the following anime titles:
{| class="wikitable"
|-
| 2010 || Princess Mononoke (Mononoke Hime)
|-
| 2012 || From Up on Poppy Hill (Kokuriko-zaka Kara)
|-
|}

XL Media
Reanimedia undertook preparation for publication (including dubbing and mastering) of the following work licensed by XL Media:
{| class="wikitable"
|-
| 2012 || Magical Shopping Arcade Abenobashi (Abenobashi Mahō Shōtengai)
|-
|}

Crowd funding projects

On May 10, 2011, Reanimedia started a crowd funding project People's License. The purpose of the project was to license Makoto Shinkai's anime Children Who Chase Lost Voices from Deep Below (Hoshi o Ou Kodomo) which was released in Japan on May 7, 2011. On May 24, 2011, Reanimedia reported that the project was successful, and Reanimedia began preparations for signing a license agreement. The movie was successfully licensed by September 28, 2011, demonstrated in theaters since November, 2011 and released on DVD in 2012. The participants of People's License were offered a limited DVD edition of the movie.

List of the crowd funding projects of Reanimedia:

See also

 XL Media 
 Mega-Anime
 Istari comics 
 RUSCICO (Russian Cinema Council)

References

External links
  
 

Anime companies
Russian companies established in 2007
Entertainment companies of Russia
Multinational companies headquartered in Russia
Russian brands
Companies based in Voronezh